Steve Holden (born 12 December 1952 in Liverpool, England) was a former motorcycle speedway rider in National League (speedway)

He started his speedway career at Chesterton stadium, where for one season only, the team was known as Chesterton Potters, riding in 6 meetings in 1973 and averaging 5 points a match. Gaining a regular team place with Stoke Potters in 1974 he rode in 35 meetings, raising his average to 5.87. The same year, he had one match for Belle Vue Aces but had only 2 rides, failing to score in either.

In 1975 he rode still for Stoke Potters and over 14 meetings, having 50 rides, he raised his points average to 7.92. He had 2 meetings for Cradley Heathens where he managed 5 rides.

Harry Bastable brought him to Oxford Cheetahs in their first year of National League in 1976, the Rebels having moved to White City with Danny Dunton. Steve became a crowd favourite, not just by riding but by living locally and getting involved off-track, such as dee-jaying at the Supporters Club, and, in Easter 1976, taking chocolate eggs to the children's ward of the John Radcliffe Hospital. With Cliff Anderson, he worked on track maintenance, looking after safety features such as boarding up the wire fencing, which had to be put up and taken down at every meeting so as not to obscure the view of the greyhound track on their race nights.

Before speedway, Steve had been a Private in the Royal Corps of Signals, following an apprenticeship as a Hydraulic Fitter.

He  lived in Wolverhampton with his family until his death in hospital in the early hours of 13 December 2014.

References

External links
 https://www.facebook.com/steve.holden.16
 http://www.stokepotters.co/briefhistory

1952 births
British motorcycle racers
British speedway riders
Stoke Potters riders
Oxford Cheetahs riders
2014 deaths